Chanyu or Shanyu, short for Chengli Gutu Chanyu, was the title used by the supreme rulers of Inner Asian nomads for eight centuries  until superseded by the title "Khagan" in 402 CE.  The title was most famously used by the ruling Luandi clan of the Xiongnu during the Qin dynasty (221–206 BCE) and Han dynasty (206 BCE–220 CE).  It was later also used infrequently by the Chinese as a reference to Tujue leaders.

Etymology

According to the Book of Han, "the Xiongnu called the Heaven (天) Chēnglí (撐犁) and they called a child (子) gūtú (孤塗).  As for Chányú (單于), it is a "vast [and] great appearance" (廣大之貌).".

L. Rogers and Edwin G. Pulleyblank argue that the title chanyu may be equivalent to the later attested title tarkhan, suggesting that the Chinese pronunciation was originally dān-ĥwāĥ, an approximation for *darxan. Linguist Alexander Vovin tentatively proposes a Yeniseian etymology for 撐犁孤塗單于, in Old Chinese pronunciation *treng-ri kwa-la dar-ɢwā, from four roots: **tɨŋgɨr- "high", *kwala- "son, child", *tɨl "lower reaches of the Yenisei" or "north", and *qʌ̄j ~ *χʌ̄j "prince"; as a whole "Son of Heaven, Ruler of the North".

List of Xiongnu Chanyus

Notes

Northern Xiongnu (北匈奴)

Southern Xiongnu (南匈奴)

Da Chanyu (大單于)

Chanyu family trees

See also 
 Shan Yu
Mulan
Khan

References

Further reading 
 Yap, Joseph P. (2019). The Western Regions, Xiongnu and Han, from the Shiji, Hanshu and Hou Hanshu. .

Heads of state
Royal titles
Noble titles
Titles of national or ethnic leadership
 
Chinese royal titles